Shahzaib Ahmed (born 8 September 1991) is a Pakistani first-class cricketer who plays for Peshawar cricket team. In September 2019, he was named in Balochistan's squad for the 2019–20 Quaid-e-Azam Trophy tournament.

References

External links
 

1991 births
Living people
Pakistani cricketers
Karachi cricketers
Karachi Blues cricketers
Karachi Whites cricketers
Peshawar cricketers
Port Qasim Authority cricketers
Cricketers from Karachi